Jimmy Hannan (25 August 1934 – 7 January 2019) was an Australian radio and television personality, variety show host, singer, entertainer and game show host of the 1960s and 1970s. One of the pioneers of television, he appeared regularly on variety show In Melbourne Tonight, and later hosted his own musical variety show Jimmy, later called Tonight with Jimmy Hannan. Hannan hosted music show Saturday Date from 1963 until 1967, which featured such performers as Billy Thorpe and Olivia Newton-John. He won the 1965 Gold Logie award for most popular personality on Australian television.

Early life and career
Hannan had his start musically performing in a big-band. As a teen idol, he often performed with people such as Johnny Devlin and Little Pattie. He released the single "Beach Ball", originally recorded by the City Surfers, in 1963. The song was written by Roger McGuinn who went on to become a member  of the Byrds. The single reached number No. 2 on the local charts and featured the Bee Gees as backing vocalists. He worked on radio in Melbourne at 3UZ and at 2GB Sydney. He hosted game shows including Name That Tune and Celebrity Squares.

Personal life
Hannan was married to Joanne Goode and had four children, including actress and model Melissa Hannan who won the Miss Australia title in 1981 and was also in the Miss World competition held in London. He retired from show business at 50 in 1984, and died on 7 January 2019, aged 84, from cancer in Bellingen, New South Wales.

Filmography

Actor

Soundtrack

Discography

EPs

Singles

References

External links

1937 births
2019 deaths
Australian television personalities
Australian male singers
Gold Logie winners
Deaths from cancer in New South Wales
Australian radio personalities